The Michigan City Public Library is a  one level facility located in Michigan City, Indiana. It was designed by the world-renowned architect Helmut Jahn.  Jahn designed the building while working for the Chicago architecture firm C.F. Murphy, which later would become Jahn Architects. The design began in 1974 and the construction was completed in 1977.

Building design 

The exterior walls are constructed out of translucent fiberglass, which allows diffused daylight to enter during the day and creates a soft glow outside at night. These translucent exterior walls do not permit outward views but rather directs attention inward toward an exterior courtyard in the center of the building. The landscaped courtyard provides an outdoor space for reading and various activates for the library visitors. Inside the courtyard, there is a sculpture designed by artist Thomas Scarff, Centura.  The sawtoothed roof profile incorporates long clearstory windows that collect soft northern daylight and shields the direct southern sunlight. The exterior façade expresses the structural pipe columns and sawtooth roof structure. Originally the exposed steel structure was painted white, but have since then been painted grey.

The main entrance originally featured a covered recessed entrance with one of the clearstory windows continuing through exterior space to the edge of the building, expressing the buildings transparency and structure at the entrance. Later the recessed entrance was enclosed to provide a vestibule. This helps to prevent blasts of cold winter air in the winter but it flattened the façade and negatively changed the character of the entrance. Inside all of the ceiling and roof elements, including suspended lights, and exposed colorfully painted ductwork is arranged along the diagonal clearstory structural grid, while all of the walls and furnishings are organized orthogonally, relating to the building envelope. The interior space is open and flexible. Administrative offices have low partitions near the perimeter and the only full-height walls are for meeting spaces and building services. The original interiors had warm striped yellow and gold carpeting with blue upholstered seating, which was later replaced. The exposed white ceilings with exposed white structural steel and green ductwork painted ductwork remain as originally designed.

Awards 

 Illinois Council of the American Institute of Architects 1977 State Design Honor Award
 Chicago Chapter of the American Institute of Architects 1977 Distinguished Building Award
 American Institute of Steel Construction, Inc. 1979 Architectural Award of Excellence

Controversy 

 The location of the 1977-built Michigan City Public Library was met with significant outcry by the community back in the 1970s when plans became public because the library's proposed location would completely block Franklin Street (Michigan CIty's 'main street') from the lake front. Michigan City officials prevailed and the library was built directly on land that was Franklin Street (between 4th Street and Michigan Boulevard). The library's 1977 placement ended downtown Michigan City's view toward Lake Michigan, as well as its direct access to Michigan City's crown jewel: its lake front – with its renowned beaches, zoo, harbor, (etc.) which drew locals as well as visitors from Chicago and many areas from throughout the Midwest and beyond.

Franklin Street was the main thoroughfare in downtown Michigan City and the only direct artery to Michigan City's lake front coast on Lake Michigan – via a draw bridge over Trail Creek.  Critics of the library's 1977 location were proven correct.  After the redesign of downtown Michigan City in the mid-1970s (including adding indirect traffic flows to lake front), the old downtown died as inconvenienced shoppers migrated primarily to growing areas on the southern end of Franklin Street (Route 421).

References 

Libraries in Indiana